Shaanxi Normal University (SNNU) is a university in Xi'an, China. It was included in the 211 Project in 2006 and started its high-speed development. It is a Chinese state Double First Class University Plan university, identified by the Ministry of Education of China.

Overview 

Directly administered by the Ministry of Education of China, Shaanxi Normal University, a key university under the construction plan of China’s national "211 Project" and a university under China’s Innovation Platform Construction Plan of the "985" Superior Discipline of Teacher Education, is a major base for training teachers and administrators of higher learning institutes and secondary schools as well as other high-level professionals in China, and is known as the “Cradle of Teachers” in Northwest China. During its 70-year history in education, the University, while rooted in China’s West, has embraced the whole country, developed a school spirit of “Morality, Learning, Aspiration and Action” and has seen itself become firmly established in Western China as an influential top-tier comprehensive teachers training university, as it strives to achieve the goal of building itself to be a major comprehensive research university distinguished by its teacher education. In 2014, the university was rank 71 in China, and rank 8 in Chinese normal universities.

The university, covering an area of more than 2,700 mu (180 hectares), is located in Xi’an, well known for its cultural history. SNNU has two campuses: Yanta and Chang’an. Built in 2000, the Chang’an Campus fosters junior, senior and postgraduate students. The Yanta Campus, with a 60-year-history, teaches foundation subjects and common courses for freshmen and sophomores, as well as guiding teachers, continuing education students, trainees and international students. The Yanta Campus is located adjacent to the famous Big Wild Goose Pagoda (Da Yan Ta) tourist site. The Chang’an Campus is located in the “Enterprise Garden of University Education” in Guodu County.

The university contains 20 colleges and two foundation teaching departments, 62 majors, ten mobile doctoral programs, six postdoctoral centers of first rank discipline, 69 doctoral programs, 24 masters centers of first rank discipline, 159 master's degree programs, and the organization authorized to issue diplomas for educational master's degrees and the masters of college teachers at work. Among the 12 such authorized organizations with the rights of issuing diplomas in China, SNU covers 11 authorized majors including philosophy, economics, law, pedagogy, literature, history, science, engineering, administration, agriculture, and medicine. It also has three national key disciplines, one national key discipline in education yielding two excellent doctoral dissertations among 100 national doctoral dissertations, two national bases of fundamental learning and personnel cultivation, one national key engineering laboratory, one State experimental teaching demonstration center, one research base on human sciences under the Chinese Ministry of Education, one sports sociology research base affiliated with the State Sports General Administration, three key laboratory & engineering research centers affiliated with the Ministry of Education, six key provincial laboratory and engineering research centers, three key provincial research bases on human sciences, five provincial experimental teaching demonstration centers, and 60 research centers of all lines. The university has a College of Continuing Education, a College of Internet Education, a College of Teaching Cadres Education, and a Vocational Education College of Higher Learning, among others. In addition, there are also decades of academic societies and organizations such as the Northwest Normal Teacher Training Center under the Ministry of Education, the Northwest Educational Administration Training Center under the Ministry of Education, the Basic Education Curriculum Research Center under the Ministry of Education, the Northwest Comprehensive Book Information Center, The Society of Tang Dynasty History, and the Society of Ancient Chinese Capitals, among others.

The university has a faculty of 3,850, among whom 1,421 hold higher professional qualifications including 292 full professors, 452 associate professors, and 194 doctoral supervisors, over 68% of whom have MA and Ph.D. degrees. There are five national experts and five provincial experts with outstanding contributions, respectively, one post of specially-hired professor and one lecturer under the Project of Changjiang Scholars Award, one national celebrated teacher, eleven provincial celebrated teachers, three candidates of the first and second hierarchs under the “National Project of Millions of Persons”, one candidate in the national “New Century Project of Millions of Persons”, twelve candidates in the “New Century Excellent Talents Supporting Project”, seven candidates in the "Awards and Subsidizing Project of Outstanding Young Teachers", ten candidates in the “Three-Five Personnel Cultivation Project of Shaanxi Province”, six State outstanding teachers, one candidate in the National Propaganda and Culture System, one national teaching group and four provincial teaching groups. In recent years, the university has actively adjusted its policy for personnel introduction, and as a result, almost one hundred well-known domestic scholars have been invited as part-time professors, among whom there are ten members of the Chinese Academy of Sciences.

The current enrollment of the university is approximately 40,000 students, more than 25,000 of whom are enrolled in part-time and non-degree studies.

The university's old campus is located adjacent to the main campus of Xi'an International Studies University.

Academics

Colleges 

·Department of Humanities and Social Sciences

·Department of Science and Engineering

·College of Political Economy

·College of Chinese Literature

·College of History & Civilization

·College of Education

·College of Psychology

·College of Foreign Languages

·College of Continuing Education

·College of Physics & Information Technology

·College of Chemistry & Materials Science

·College of Life Sciences

·College of Tourism & Environment

·College of Sport

·College of News and Media

·College of Computer Science

·College of Music

·College of Fine Arts

·College of International Business

·International College of Chinese Studies

·Department of Minority Studies

·College of Distance Education

·College of Mathematics & Information Science

·College of Food Engineering & Nutritional Science

·College of Teachers' & Administrators' Training

Rankings 
In 2017, Times Higher Education ranked the university within the 801-1000 band globally.

Operations
 and since 2006, the university sends a handwritten letter to each admitted student.

SNNU People

Famous alumni
 Li Can - Fellow of Chinese Academy of Sciences
 Yang Xiaosheng
 Zhao Wei - Rector of University of Macau

Affiliated Schools 

There are two elementary schools,two kindergartens and one secondary school attached to the university.

The secondary school attached to the university is now one of the more prestigious secondary schools in the province, formerly known as the No. 84 Secondary School.

References

External links 
Shaanxi Normal University's official website in English.
Official website in Simplified Chinese.

 
Teachers colleges in China
1944 establishments in China
Educational institutions established in 1944